Enseñame a vivir (Teach me to live) is an Argentine telenovela produced by Pol-ka and broadcast by El Trece from May 12 to December 14, 2009.

Cast 
 Pablo Rago as Lucas Antonio Linares
 Violeta Urtizberea as Asaí/Clodine Fernández Salguero
 Jorge Suárez as Félix Argentino Benítez
 Laura Azcurra as Marcela Correale
 Felipe Colombo as Cristobal Amadeo Linares
 Agustina Lecouna as Maria Luján Fernández Salguero
 Julieta Zylberberg as Clodine Fernández Salguero/Lorena Beatriz Benítez
 Adela Gleijer as Amanda Fernández Salguero
 Patricia Etchegoyen as Emilia Benítez
 Jorge Maggio as Ignacio "Nacho" Miguens
 Germán Kraus as Manuel Goyena
 Pepe Monje as Angel Farsa
 Ana María Picchio as Pomona
 Laura Cymer as Ro
 Daniela Aita as Chipsy
 Fernando Dente as Miguel Angel "Macu"

Plot 
On a flight back to Buenos Aires, the millionaire Fernández Salguero family, their young daughter, Clodine, and servants, are stranded in the jungle after their jet malfunctions. The only survivors are Clodine and servants (the Benítez family), one of whom has a daughter of similar age (Lorena). They decide to abandon Clodine in the wild and tell their own young daughter to take the identity of Clodine in order to get her inheritance. They manage to convince her grandmother, Amanda Fernández Salguero, that Lorena is actually her granddaughter.

20 years later, the news reports the findings of "a young girl of the jungle" who was raised by monkeys. Responding to the name "Asai", she appears to have survived in the wild for the last 20 years. Amanda, stirred by the memory of the tragic loss of her son and daughter-in-law, invites "Asai" to live with her, and the secret of the Benítez family is threatened by her appearance.

Awards and nominations

References

External links 
  
 

2009 telenovelas
Argentine telenovelas
Pol-ka telenovelas
2009 Argentine television series debuts
2009 Argentine television series endings
Spanish-language telenovelas